The melampittas are a family, Melampittidae, of New Guinean birds containing two enigmatic species. The two species are found in two genera, the greater melampitta in the genus Megalampitta and the lesser melampitta in the genus Melampitta. They are little studied and before being established as a family in 2014 their taxonomic relationships with other birds were uncertain, being considered at one time related variously to the pittas, Old World babblers and birds-of-paradise.

These are small to medium-sized birds with black plumage, strong legs and short, rounded wings. Mostly terrestrial, they live in montane forest. The greater melampitta has more specific habitat needs, roosting and nesting in limestone sinkholes. Insects and small vertebrates are taken from the forest leaf litter. Little is known about their breeding behaviour, with only the nests of the lesser melampitta having been seen by scientists. Both species are considered to be safe from extinction.

Taxonomy
The taxonomic placement of the melampittas was the source of long-standing confusion. Based on their superficial resemblance to the suboscine pittas (plump bodies, short tails and long legs), Hermann Schlegel  placed the lesser melampitta within that family when he described that species in 1871. The name melampitta is derived from the Ancient Greek melas- for "black" with the genus name "Pitta". As Ernst Mayr demonstrated that the structure of the syrinx was that of an oscine bird the genus was later moved to the Old World babblers (an infamous "taxonomic dustbin"), then to Orthonychidae (where some authorities still retain them) and then to the jewel-babblers and whipbirds (the treatment used by the 2007 Handbook of the Birds of the World).

Based on the analysis of DNA–DNA hybridization data the genus was placed with the Paradisaeidae birds of paradise by Sibley and Ahlquist.  Frith and Frith felt these conclusions were not supported by aspects of the behaviour and biology (although they argued it may have been related to the recently split Cnemophilidae birds of paradise). More recent studies have refuted the relationship with the whipbirds and jewel-babblers, and instead consistently shown a relationship as the sister taxa to a group of families including the drongos, fantails, monarch flycatchers, Corcoracidae (the white-winged chough and apostlebird of Australia) and the birds of paradise again. The fact that the melampittas do not closely resemble these families (except the Corcoracidae and to a lesser extent the birds of paradise) may be due to adaptations to terrestrial living, compared to the other families which are mostly arboreal. Given the distinctiveness of the two melampittas it was suggested that the genus be placed its own family, and a new family, Melampittidae, was formally erected in 2014 by Richard Schodde and Leslie Christidis.

Most researchers also accepted that the two species are congeneric (are both in the same genus), although the two species do have a number of differences, particularly morphologically. After further research in 2014 Schodde and Christidis moved the greater melampitta into its own genus Megalampitta. Although the name was created to invoke the Greek mega for large and Melampitta for the genus, the authors of the paper stated that it was a random collection of letters. It is possible that the two species may be separated into two families in the future. The lesser melampitta was once thought to have three subspecies, but these were distinguished by slight differences in measurements that were probably clinal,  so both it and greater melampitta are now treated as being monotypic.

Distribution and habitat

The greater melampitta is restricted to areas of rugged limestone karst with sinkholes that it apparently roosts and even nests in. Both species have a discontinuous distribution across New Guinea, and the greater melampitta is generally a rare bird that is seldom encountered, although this may because it lives in rarely-visited areas.

Description

The two melampittas are pitta-like birds that have entirely black plumage and strong long legs and large strong feet. The wings are short and rounded, and the primary feathers are uniquely recurved and emarginated. The feathers of the forecrown are erectile. The bill of the greater melampitta is also larger than that of the lesser melampitta, which is hooked. There is some variation in the family in the tails. The greater melampitta has specially strengthened remiges and retriges, which are often worn, a possible adaptation to its habit of roosting in limestone sinkholes. Those sinkholes are too deep and narrow to fly directly out and the tail may be used to help cling to the side of the hole as it exits, in the fashion of a woodpecker. The tail of that species is long, whereas the tail of the lesser melampitta is short; in both species end of the tail is rounded. Both species move around on the ground by hopping.

The plumage of both sexes in both species are almost identical, with the only difference being iris colour in the lesser melampitta, the male having a red iris and the female a brown one. The plumage of juvenile lesser melampittas is the same as adults except they are brown on the lower body. Several researchers have noted that the plumage of juvenile greater melampittas resembles that of the hooded pitohui. Hooded pitohuis are unusual for birds in having a toxin, homobatrachotoxin, in their feathers and skin which can cause convulsions and death if consumed. The resemblance is probably an example of Batesian mimicry as the greater melampitta is not itself poisonous.

The calls of the two species are not similar. The call of the greater melampitta is a double or triple note, which is slurred and repeated monotonously, and is reminiscent of the black pitohui. The call of the lesser melampitta are either harsh buzzy notes or chirped whistles, both of which are repeated at intervals.

Behaviour
The greater melampitta is reported to be very shy and wary, but also inquisitive and may approach people sitting quietly to investigate. It is usually revealed by its calls, and can be very difficult to locate if it is not calling.

Diet and feeding
The melampittas are insectivores, although in the case of the greater melampitta, this statement is inference as their diet isn't described. All that is known is that it sticks to the ground and understory. The lesser melampitta feeds on insects as well as worms, snails, small frogs and even small fruit. It forages on the ground, probing through leaves by flipping them with its bill.

Breeding
The breeding behaviour of the melampittas is only known in any detail for the lesser melampitta. All that is known of the breeding of the greater melampitta are reports from local people that it creates nests that are baskets of vines suspended in the limestone sinkholes that it roosts in. There is also some evidence that it may be territorial. The lesser melampitta is known to start nesting in the dry season and continue into the beginning of the wet. The nest is a closed dome shape constructed out of live green moss. The nest that has been described was found  from the ground on the side of a tree fern, with nesting material woven into the bark and attached to dead fronds of the tree fern to secure it. The female lays a single chalky white and slightly speckled egg, which measures , and undertakes all the incubation duties. The incubation is quite long for a small passerine, lasting around 27 days, during which the male will feed the female. Both sexes feed the single chick, which is hatched covered in downy feathers. Unlike their relatives in the birds of paradise family, which feed their chicks by regurgitation, the parents feed the chick whole food that has not been swallowed. The chick takes up to 35 days to fledge, a long time for passerines.

Status
Neither species of melampitta is believed to be threatened with extinction. The greater melampitta is not generally common across New Guinea, but appears to be relatively common in its preferred habitat type when that habitat is studied. The lesser melampitta is less restricted in its habitat requirements and is common over a large area. Because of this, and the fact that their habitat is not considered to be threatened and their populations are considered to be stable, both species are listed as least concern by the International Union for Conservation of Nature.

References

 
Taxa named by Richard Schodde
Taxa named by Leslie Christidis
Taxonomy articles created by Polbot